Janthina umbilicata, also known as the elongate janthina, is a species of holoplanktonic sea snail, a marine gastropod mollusk in the family Epitoniidae, the violet snails or purple storm snails.

Description
The maximum recorded shell length is 9.5 mm.

Habitat
Minimum recorded depth is 0 m. Maximum recorded depth is 0 m.

References

Epitoniidae
Gastropods described in 1841